The Nereidum Montes is a mountain range on Mars. It stretches 1,143 km, northeast of Argyre Planitia.  It is in the Argyre quadrangle.  The mountains are named after a Classical albedo feature. Nereidum Montes has gullies in some areas.

A hummocky relief resembling Veiki moraines has been found in Nereidum Montes. The relief is hypothesized to result very much like Veiki moraines from the melting of a martian glacier.

References

Mountains on Mars
Argyre quadrangle